The Cornwall Combination League is a football competition based in the western half of Cornwall, England, formed in 1959. The current league sponsors are drinks retailers LWC.

The league has a single division of 20 clubs, being larger than any league below step 6 in the English football league system. The Champion club may apply for promotion to the St Piran Football League, West Division. The bottom clubs may be relegated to one of the level 13 leagues of the English football league system – normally the Trelawny League.

No Cornwall Combination clubs are currently eligible for national competitions; the only time a club from the league has played in the FA Cup was when Falmouth Town played a single match in 1983–84, the only season Falmouth's first team played in the Combination.

In 2009, Troon were accepted back into the league after an eight-season absence to replace the promoted Perranporth. In 2010, Pendeen returned to the league after 12 seasons in junior football and Portreath were relegated. In 2011, Falmouth Athletic DC were promoted into the league at the expense of Ludgvan who were relegated. Helston Athletic took the title and accepted promotion into the South West Peninsula League in Division One West. In 2012, Goonhavern and Ludgvan returned to the Combination League after finishing top two in the Trelawny League whilst Penzance Reserves were relegated to the Trelawny League.
Redruth United join the league for the 2013-14 competition replacing Holman Sports who were relegated and for the 2014-15 season Helston Athletic Reserves joined the league from the Trelawny League, replacing Falmouth Athletic who folded.

Member clubs 2022–23
Goonhavern Athletic
Hayle Reserves
Helston Athletic 3rds
Mawnan
Pendeen Rovers
Porthleven Reserves
Praze
RNAS Culdrose
Rosudgeon
St Agnes Reserves
St Day Reserves
St Ives Town
St Just
Wendron United 3rds

List of Champions

External links

Website containing league tables, match scores and other information about the league since the 1959–60 season

 
2
Football leagues in England
Sports leagues established in 1959
1959 establishments in England